R378 road may refer to:
 R378 road (Ireland)
 R378 road (South Africa)